L2 is a pop duo consisting of New York City based sisters Melissa Labbadia, 22, and Jessica Labbadia, 19. Their music has been featured on many popular celebrity sites, and they have had two singles on the Billboard Hot Dance/Club chart.

Career

Early years
Melissa and Jessica Labbadia started singing, acting and performing at a young age. They recorded their first demo CD and wrote their first original song in 2005. The sisters went on to perform at many venues in New York City, including Manhattan dance clubs Tenjune and Splash; the rock clubs The Bitter End, DROM, Arlene’s Grocery, and The Cutting Room; cabaret style at Don’t Tell Mama in NYC. L2 have also opened for popular performers such as Ryan Cabrera, Donnie Klang and Anberlin.

2011-2012
In 2011, they released their single Criminal In Bed. The song played on Sirius/XM Radio along with many other FM stations.  The band made their debut on the Billboard Hot Dance/Club charts with the Top 10 single Boys or Girls. The song got regular radio rotation on National Mix-shows across the country and played nationally in rotation on Music Choice Dance and AOL Radio, along with many Internet Radio stations and local FM radio stations. L2's single Insomnia made it to the number 3 spot on the Billboard Hot Dance/Club charts in February 2012, and was still on the charts in March.

Music videos
The duo released their first music video for Boys or Girls on January 18, 2011. Their next music video, Insomnia, was released on February 3, 2012 just after the single became the #3 Breakout Song on the Billboard Dance/Club Charts. The video was directed by Matt Alonzo (Far East Movement "Like A G6").

TV placements
L2 has signed non-exclusive music licensing deals with Dish Nation (Fox TV), DMX, MTV/VH1 Networks and Bunim Murray. Many of their songs have been played on Keeping Up with the Kardashians, Tough Love and The Real World: San Diego. Recently, the song Beautiful was played on an episode of Khloe and Lamar.

References

External links
 L2OfficialMusic.com – L2's official website
 Twitter – Official Twitter account
 YouTube - Official YouTube account
 Boys or Girls video on YouTube
 Insomnia video on YouTube

American pop music duos
Sibling musical duos
Female musical duos